Route 350 is a provincial highway located in the Mauricie region of Quebec. It runs from the junction of Route 348 in Saint-Édouard-de-Maskinongé to the junction of Route 153 west of Saint-Boniface-de-Shawinigan. It overlaps Route 349 in Saint-Paulin and Route 351 in Charette.

Towns along Route 350

 Saint-Édouard-de-Maskinongé
 Sainte-Ursule
 Sainte-Angèle-de-Prémont
 Saint-Paulin
 Charette
 Saint-Boniface

Major intersections

See also
 List of Quebec provincial highways

References

External links 
 Transports Quebec Official Road Map 
 Route 350 on Google Maps

350
Roads in Mauricie